Bunk may refer to:


People

Nickname, given name or stage name
 Bunk Congalton (1875–1937), Canadian Major League Baseball player
 Bunk Henderson, American Negro league catcher in 1925
 Bunk Johnson (1879–1949), New Orleans jazz trumpeter
 Oscar Requer, nicknamed "The Bunk", a former Baltimore police detective upon whom the character Bunk Moreland (see below) is based
 Bunk Gardner, stage name of American musician John Leon Guarnera (born 1933), member of Frank Zappa's Mothers of Invention

Surname
 Carsten Bunk (born 1960), German rower who competed for East Germany in the 1980 Summer Olympics
 Leo Bunk (born 1962), German former footballer
 Tom Bunk (born 1945), American cartoonist

Arts and entertainment
 Bunk (TV series), a 2012 television show on the Independent Film Channel
 "Bunk", an episode of the television series CSI: Miami (season 1)
 Bunk (book), a 2017 book by Kevin Young
 Bunk Moreland, a character on the HBO drama series The Wire
 Bunks (film), a 2013 Canada television film

Other uses
 Chicory, a plant also known as bunk
 Bunking (off), or bunk off, slang for truanting

See also
 Bunk bed, a type of bed in which one bed (or bunk) is stacked over another
 Bunk'd, a 2015 American comedy television series

Lists of people by nickname